William Hepburn Scott (November 5, 1837 – July 11, 1881) was an Ontario lawyer and political figure. He represented the region of Peterborough West in the Legislative Assembly of Ontario as a Conservative member from 1875 to 1881.

He was born in Brampton in Upper Canada in 1837 and studied at the University of Toronto. He studied law, was called to the bar in 1863 and entered practice with his brother. He married Sarah Jane, the daughter of George Wright, an MLA for Canada West, in 1863. He later moved to Peterborough. He ran unsuccessfully for Peterborough West in the House of Commons in 1874. Scott was elected to the 2nd Parliament of Ontario for Peterborough West in an 1875 by-election. He was defeated in the provincial general election held in 1875 but was declared elected on appeal. He was reelected in 1879. Scott served as a director for the Huron and Quebec Railway. He died at Orangeville in 1881.

External links 

The Scot in British North America
The Canadian parliamentary companion and annual register, 1878, CH Mackintosh

1837 births
1881 deaths
Progressive Conservative Party of Ontario MPPs